Ancistrostylis is a genus of flowering plants belonging to the family Plantaginaceae.

Its native range is Indo-China.

Species:

Ancistrostylis harmandii

References

Plantaginaceae
Plantaginaceae genera